The Tavoyan or Dawei dialect of Burmese is spoken in Dawei (Tavoy), in the coastal Tanintharyi Region of southern Myanmar (Burma).

Also, voicing only with unaspirated consonants, whereas in standard Burmese, voicing can occur with both aspirated and unaspirated consonants. Also, there are many loan words from Malay and Thai not found in Standard Burmese. An example is the word for goat, which is hseit in Standard Burmese but bê in Tavoyan, most likely from Mon  or Thai  (แพะ).

In the Tavoyan dialect, terms of endearment, as well as family terms, are considerably different from Standard Burmese.

Rhymes
The following is a list of rhyme correspondences unique to the Tavoyan dialect

References

 

Burmese language